Anywayawanna is the debut studio album by English dance and electronic music group The Beatmasters, released in 1989 on the Rhythm King record label. It should not be confused with their 2004 compilation album, Anywayawanna – The Best of The Beatmasters, which features similar artwork.

Singles
The album includes five singles: "Rok da House", featuring the Cookie Crew (UK No. 5), "Burn It Up", featuring P. P. Arnold (UK No. 14), "Who's in the House?" (UK No. 8), "Hey DJ/I Can't Dance to That Music You're Playing", which features Betty Boo (credited as MC Betty Boop on the album) (UK No. 7), and "Warm Love", featuring Claudia Fontaine (UK No. 51).

Critical reception

In a retrospective review for AllMusic, Keith Farley gave Anywayawanna four out of five stars, describing it as "a kinetic journey through sampledelic house" and "a great production with none of the wide-open gaps and overly raw grooves that characterize most British house of the day."

Track listing
All tracks written by Paul Carter, Manda Glanfield and Richard Walmsley, except where noted.

Note
Tracks 11 and 12 appear on CD only.

Personnel
Adapted from AllMusic.

Musicians
The Beatmasters – primary artist, producer
P. P. Arnold – guest artist, vocals
Chris Ballin – background vocals
Betty Boo – guest artist, vocals
Cookie Crew – guest artist
Claudia Fontaine – vocals, background vocals
Derek Green – background vocals
Merlin	– guest artist
Trevor Russell – vocals
Barbara Snow – trumpet
Luke Tunney – trumpet
Caron Wheeler – background vocals

Production
The Beatmasters – producer
Geoff Peche – mastering
Martin Rex – engineer
Mark "Spike" Stent – engineer
Stephen Taylor – engineer

Charts and certifications

Weekly charts

Certifications

References

External links
Anywayawanna at Discogs

1989 debut albums
The Beatmasters albums